Here at Last... Bee Gees... Live is the first live album by the Bee Gees. It was recorded on December 20, 1976 at the LA Forum and was released in May 1977 by RSO Records. It reached No. 8 in the US, No. 8 in Australia, No. 1 in New Zealand and No. 2 in Spain.

Background
Here at Last was the first official live recording released by the Bee Gees, though many bootlegs have existed throughout the years of earlier performances. The concert was filmed, and a TV special was planned, but after reviewing the footage of the Bee Gees were unhappy with the quality of the video, so it has not been released. A single from the concert, "Edge of the Universe", was released in Canada and the US, where it hit No. 16 and No. 26, respectively, on the singles charts. A promo single with "Lonely Days" live was released in the US, but did not chart.

The album was recorded at the LA Forum on December 20, 1976, and Barry Gibb can be heard wishing the audience a Merry Christmas at the end.

The content of the show consisted chiefly of songs that had been hit singles, plus songs from the recent hit albums Main Course and Children of the World. There was also a rendition of "Down the Road" from the more obscure 1974 album Mr. Natural.

The album was originally released as a 2 part LP record, and was later released as a 2-disc CD in 1990.

Track listing
All compositions by Barry, Robin and Maurice Gibb except where noted
LP 1

Side one
"I've Gotta Get a Message to You" – 4:02
"Love So Right" – 4:47
"Edge of the Universe" (Barry Gibb, Robin Gibb) – 5:15 
"Come on Over" (Barry Gibb, Robin Gibb) – 3:25 
"Can't Keep a Good Man Down" – 4:47

Side two

"New York Mining Disaster 1941" (Barry Gibb, Robin Gibb) – 2:16
Medley ("Run to Me" / "World") – 2:33
Medley ("Holiday" / "I Can't See Nobody" / "I Started a Joke" / "Massachusetts") – 7:14
"How Can You Mend a Broken Heart" (Barry Gibb, Robin Gibb) – 3:45
"To Love Somebody" (Barry Gibb, Robin Gibb) – 4:08

LP 2

Side one
"You Should Be Dancing" – 9:22
"Boogie Child" – 5:02
"Down the Road" (Barry Gibb, Robin Gibb) – 4:32
"Words" – 4:19

Side two
"Wind of Change" (Barry Gibb, Robin Gibb) – 4:42
"Nights on Broadway" – 4:41
"Jive Talkin'" – 5:03
"Lonely Days" – 4:12

Personnel
Bee Gees
Barry Gibb – lead, harmony and backing vocals, rhythm guitar
Robin Gibb – lead, harmony and backing vocals
Maurice Gibb – bass guitar, harmony vocals

Backing band
Alan Kendall – lead guitar
Dennis Bryon – drums
Blue Weaver – keyboards, synthesiser

Additional musicians
 Geoff Westley – keyboards
 Joey Murcia – lead or rhythm guitar
Joe Lala – percussion

The Boneroo Horns
 Peter Graves
 Whit Sidener
 Ken Faulk
 Peter Ballin
 Jeff Kievit
 Stan Webb

Charts

Weekly charts

Year-end charts

Certifications

References

Bee Gees albums
1977 live albums
RSO Records live albums
Albums produced by Barry Gibb
Albums produced by Robin Gibb
Albums produced by Maurice Gibb
Albums recorded at the Forum